Linda Sini (13 February 1924 – 5 February 1999) was an Italian film actress.

She made 75 appearances between 1950 and 1979 and several appearances after this, mostly in film.

Debuting in Sigillo rosso in 1950, she went on to star in films such as Luigi Zampa's comedy Anni ruggenti (1962), and the James Bond spy spoofs 002 operazione Luna and A 001, operazione Giamaica (1965).

Although primarily a film actress, she did appear in Joe Petrosino (1972) and in Il 90 in 1979. In 1986 she appeared in Anemia.

Selected filmography

 Red Seal (1950)
 Bellissima (1951) - Mimmetta
 Salvate mia figlia (1951)
 Stranger on the Prowl (1952) - Signora Raffetto
 A Mother Returns (1952) - Elena
 Rimorso (1952)
 Beauties on Motor Scooters (1952) - Franca
 Cronaca di un delitto (1953) - Elena
 La prigioniera di Amalfi (1954)
 Bella non piangere (1955) - Stelle d'oro
 Accadde tra le sbarre (1955) - Marion
 Il conte Aquila (1955)
 Toto, Peppino, and the Hussy (1956) - Gabriella
 Gastone (1960) - Lucy
 Il Mattatore (1960) - Laura, wife of Chinotto
 Tough Guys (1960) - Barbara
 Il principe fusto (1960)
 I piaceri del sabato notte (1960) - Un cliente dell'atelier
 My Friend, Dr. Jekyll (1960) - Adelaide
 Trapped by Fear (1960) - La concierge
 The 1,000 Eyes of Dr. Mabuse (1960) - Corinna
 Le ambiziose (1961) - La pittrice
 Gli incensurati (1961) - La vedova
 Mars, God of War (1962) - Ecuba
 Roaring Years (1962) - Elsa
 Sherlock Holmes and the Deadly Necklace (1962) - Light Girl
 Il Sorpasso (1962) - Zia Lidia
 I 4 monaci (1962) - La moglie del farmacista
 Sexy Toto (1963) - Hostess
 The Conjugal Bed (1963) - Mother Superior
 Gli onorevoli (1963) - Wife of Rossani-Breschi
 Follie d'estate (1963) - Moglie del signore geloso
 The Commandant (1963) - La contessa
 I cuori infranti (1963) - Baronessa Von Tellen (segment "La manina di Fatma")
 Il treno del sabato (1964) - Linda
 Amore facile (1964) - Assuntina (segment "Un uomo corretto")
 I due pericoli pubblici (1964) - Dora
 The Adventurer of Tortuga (1965) - Paquita
 Our Man in Jamaica (1965) - Signora Cervantes
 002 Operazione Luna (1965) - Leonidova
 I due parà (1965) - Consuelo
 The Man Who Laughs (1966) - Margherita
 War of the Planets (1966) - Lt. Fina Marlie
 Massacre Time (1966) - Brady
 Mi vedrai tornare (1966)
 Riderà! (Cuore matto) (1967) - Miss Fellow
 Spia spione (1967) - Margot
 Gangsters 70 (1968)
 The Longest Hunt (1968) - Dona Sol Gutierrez
 Shoot Twice (1968) - Saloon Madame
 Zingara (1969) - Maria Teresa
 Giacomo Casanova: Childhood and Adolescence (1969) - Mother Teresa
 Satiricosissimo (1970) - Agrippina
 Un caso di coscienza (1970) - Woman on train (uncredited)
 Sartana's Here... Trade Your Pistol for a Coffin (1970) - Maldida, Mantas' Woman
 La prima notte del dottor Danieli, industriale, col complesso del... giocattolo (1970) - Concettina
 Principe coronato cercasi per ricca ereditiera (1970) - Amelia
 They Call Me Hallelujah (1971) - Gertrude
 Ivanhoe, the Norman Swordsman (1971) - Mortimer's Wife
 Le inibizioni del dottor Gaudenzi, vedovo, col complesso della buonanima (1971) - Viscardi's Wife
 Seven Blood-Stained Orchids (1972) - Wanda
 Colpo grosso... grossissimo... anzi probabile (1972) - Sandro's mother
 Decameron n° 3 - Le più belle donne del Boccaccio (1972) - Maid of Isabella (segment "The Horny Horseman") (uncredited)
 Don't Torture a Duckling (1972) - Mrs. Lo Cascio - Bruno's Mother
 Poppea... una prostituta al servizio dell'impero (1972) - Agrippina
 I racconti di Viterbury - Le più allegre storie del '300 (1973) - Madonna Brenda
 Fra' Tazio da Velletri (1973) - Cosima De' Pazzi
 Diario di una vergine romana (1973) - Lucilla
 Farfallon (1974) - Figlia del colonnello
 Paolo il freddo (1974) - Countess Manescalchi
  (1975) - Teresa
 White Fang and the Hunter (1975) - Luna
 Calore in provincia (1975) - Mother of Ciccio
 Operazione Kappa: sparate a vista (1977) - Isabella / Anna's neighbour
 La compagna di banco (1977) - Mrs. Girardi
 Ring'' (1978) - Assunta Esposito

References

External links and sources 
 

Italian film actresses
1924 births
1999 deaths
20th-century Italian actresses